The Journey is the first solo album by Vinny Burns released in 1999.

Track listing
All songs written by Sam Blue and Vinny Burns except where noted.

 "Irish Eyes" (Vinny Burns) – 1:39
 "Superstar" – 4:23
 "Fire Burning" – 5:02
 "Freedom" – 4:56
 "This World" (Burns, Gary Hughes) – 6:29
 "Where You Gonna Run" – 5:57
 "I Believe" – 4:38
 "Live the Dream" – 5:29
 "Lonely Man" – 5:57
 "Already Gone" (Burns, Hughes) – 5:12
 "Falling" – 4:27
 "The Journey" (Burns) – 5:09

Personnel
Vinny Burns – guitars, bass guitar, keyboards, computer and keyboard programming
Sam Blue – lead vocals (except tracks 5 & 10)
Greg Morgan – drums
Gary Hughes – backing vocals, lead vocals (tracks 5 & 10)
James SK Wān - saxophone (tracks 5, 7 & 8)
Colin McLeod – Hammond organ (tracks 3, 4, & 6)
Craig Fletcher – fretless bass guitar (track 8)

Production
Mixing – Audu Obaje
Engineer – Ray Brophy
Additional Engineering – Audu Obaje and Tim

External links
GRTR review

Vinny Burns albums
1999 debut albums